On July 9, 1941, 193 detainees were shot in Tartu prison and the Gray House courtyard by the Soviet NKVD; their bodies were dumped in makeshift graves and in the prison well.

History 
The victims of the communist repressions of the summer 1941 were detained in Tartu prison. During the last days of June, 1941, there were 619 prisoners. As the German army approached, steps were taken to empty the prison, but as the arrests continued, on 8 July 1941 there were still 223 detainees. Thus, on a meeting of the Estonian Communist Party Tartu region committee on the demand of the local security leader Alfred Pressman (1894–1973) and with the consent of the Estonian NKVD Tartu district leader Pavel Afanasjev (1903–1941) and the Communist Party secretary Abronov, it was decided to execute the prisoners.

Executioners 
Out of the six murderers, four were ethnic Estonians, one was Peipsi area Russian. The most notable among them was the local Komsomol activist and later Thaw era deputy minister of interior of the Estonian SSR Edmund Näär (1920–1973).

See also
Tartu Credit Center Massacre

References

1941 in Estonia
July 1941 events
Massacres in 1941
Political repression in the Soviet Union
Tartu
Massacres in the Soviet Union
Massacres in Estonia
NKVD
Soviet World War II crimes
Massacres committed by the Soviet Union
Mass murder in 1941
Russian war crimes in Estonia